Betekhtin may refer to
Anatoly Betekhtin (1931–2012), Soviet military commander
Betekhtin Range in Antarctica